The Canadian Foundation for Climate and Atmospheric Sciences (CFCAS) was Canada's main funding body for university-based research on climate, atmospheric, and related oceanic work. It is now the Canadian Climate Forum. As an autonomous, charitable foundation established in 2000, CFCAS funded research that improved the scientific understanding of processes and predictions, provided relevant science to policy makers, and improved understanding of the ways in which these challenges affect human health and the natural environment in addition to strengthening Canada's scientific capacity. Its chair is Gordon McBean.

CFCAS fosters partnerships in support of innovation, investment, policy, skills development, and service delivery. It funds the generation of new knowledge that is essential to the competitiveness of industries and to the health and safety of Canadians. The foundation has invested over $117 million in university-based research related to climate and atmospheric sciences, in 24 collaborative networks, two major initiatives, and 158 projects. Several of the networks are linked to international research programs; all involved multiple partners. Complementary (leveraged) support for networks has doubled the resources available to them. The Foundation has also hosted or co-hosted a number of workshops and symposia on topics such as extreme weather and Arctic climate, and provides support to international project offices.

Research

Research funded by CFCAS informs decision- and policy-makers in government and industry, including those working in:
Municipalities – for building regulations; emergency planning; snow clearing
Energy Industry – for load forecasting; pipeline routing; pricing
Health sector – for anticipating flu/allergy seasons; tracking spread of toxins, pollutants or new diseases
Transportation industry – for plane de-icing; aviation routing; ship loads
Resource industries – for winter roads, selection of disease resistant species for reforestation planning, water stewardship
Financial services industry – for insurance rates; trade in weather derivatives
Tourist industry – for seasonal planning at resorts; hazard management; cruise routes
Sovereignty – for security infrastructure; siting of bases and support structures
Agriculture – for crop choices; pest control, tilling techniques
Weather services – for storm alerts, regional forecasts, anticipating severe events

See also
Experimental Lakes Area

References

External links
 Canadian Foundation for Climate and Atmospheric Sciences
 2010-2011 Final Report
 CFCAS Letter to PM, November 25, 2005
 Western Canadian Cryospheric Network - University of Northern British Columbia
 Canadian climate research fund drying up (Canadian Broadcasting Corporation) November 23, 2010
 Scientists warn of decline of Canadian climate research (CTV News) March 14, 2010
 Arctic research centre scrambles to survive (canada.com) February 17, 2009

Further reading

Climatological research organizations
Foundations based in Canada
Scientific organizations based in Canada